It Was an Accident is a 2000 British comedy film directed by Metin Hüseyin, written by Ol Parker and produced by Paul Goodman, based on the novel of the same name by Jeremy Cameron and starring Thandiwe Newton, Chiwetel Ejiofor, Max Beesley and James Bolam. In the film, an ex-convict, trying to go straight, accidentally gets mixed up in a fresh series of crimes.

Cast

References

External links
 
 

2000 films
British crime comedy films
2000s crime comedy films
2000 comedy films
2000s English-language films
2000s British films